The 2004 Tippeligaen was the 60th completed season of top division football in Norway. The season began on 12 April 2004 and ended on 30 October 2004.

Each team played 26 games with three points given for wins and one point for a draw. Number thirteen and fourteen are relegated, number twelve has to play two qualification matches (home and away) against number three in the first division (where number one and two are directly promoted) for the last spot.

Overview

Summary
Rosenborg won their thirteenth consecutive title and 19th top-flight title overall. Stabæk and Sogndal were relegated. Rosenborg, Vålerenga, Brann and Tromsø finished in the top four and qualified for the 2004–05 Royal League.

Teams and locations

Note: Table lists in alphabetical order.

League table

Relegation play-offs
Bodø/Glimt won the play-offs against Kongsvinger 4–1 on aggregate.

Results

Season statistics

Top scorers

Attendances

References

External links
League table
Fixtures
Goalscorers

Eliteserien seasons
1
Norway
Norway